The term "nursery rhyme" emerged in the 1820s, although this type of children's literature previously existed with different names such as Tommy Thumb Songs and Mother Goose Songs. The first known book containing a collection of these texts was Tommy Thumb's Pretty Song Book, which was published by Mary Cooper in 1744. The works of several scholars and collectors helped document and preserve these oral traditions as well as their histories. These include Iona and Peter Opie, Joseph Ritson, James Orchard Halliwell, and Sir Walter Scott.

Nursery rhymes
The following is a list of nursery rhymes.

References

Nursery rhymes
List
Nursery Rhymes